Diego Ezequiel Meza (born 28 April 1999) is an Argentine professional footballer who plays as a midfielder.

Career
Meza's career started with Atlético de Rafaela. He made his professional football bow during a 2016–17 Argentine Primera División fixture with Tigre on 22 June 2017, in a campaign which ended with relegation to Primera B Nacional. Three appearances followed in 2017–18, with the midfielder netting his first senior goal in the process against Villa Dálmine in April 2018. In January 2020, Meza was loaned for twelve months to Unión Sunchales of Torneo Federal A.

Career statistics
.

References

External links

1999 births
Living people
People from Resistencia, Chaco
Argentine footballers
Association football midfielders
Argentine Primera División players
Primera Nacional players
Torneo Federal A players
Atlético de Rafaela footballers
Unión de Sunchales footballers
Sportspeople from Chaco Province